The discography of American vocalist, film director, screenwriter, and film producer Rob Zombie consists of seven studio albums, three compilation albums, two remix albums, two live albums, one video album, 23 singles, and eight promotional singles. Zombie first rose to fame as a member of the heavy metal band White Zombie, with whom he released four studio albums; the group disbanded in 1998. Opting to continue making music as a solo artist, Zombie began working on his debut solo studio album that would come to be known as Hellbilly Deluxe: 13 Tales of Cadaverous Cavorting Inside the Spookshow International (1998). The project became a commercial success for Zombie, entering the top five of the Billboard 200 in the United States and selling over three million copies in the United States alone. The album spawned three singles, all of which were used extensively in films and video games following their release. Zombie released remixed versions of songs from his debut studio album on American Made Music to Strip By (1999), which peaked inside the top forty in the United States.

More than three years after the release of Hellbilly Deluxe, Zombie released his second studio album The Sinister Urge (2001). The album became his second top ten debut in the United States, with first week sales exceeding that if its predecessor. The album spawned one official single, though four promotional singles were released for radio airplay in the United States. He released the compilation album Past, Present & Future in 2003, composed of songs from his time with White Zombie along with music from his first two studio albums and soundtrack appearances. The album became Zombie's third to sell over one million copies worldwide, and remains his final album to do so. Zombie's third studio album, Educated Horses (2006), featured a shift in musical style and became his second to reach the top five of the Billboard 200 chart. Educated Horses sold over 500,000 copies in the United States since its release. Following the release of Educated Horses, Zombie released his first official greatest hits album, The Best of Rob Zombie (2006). The album was re-released only months later under the title The Best of Rob Zombie: 20th Century Masters The Millennium Collection.

He released his first live album, Zombie Live, in 2007. He officially returned to music nearly three years later with the release of his fourth studio album, Hellbilly Deluxe 2: Noble Jackals, Penny Dreadfuls and the Systematic Dehumanization of Cool (2010). It became his fourth top ten on the Billboard 200, reaching number eight on the weekly chart. The album saw a decline in sales from his previous releases, selling just over 200,000 copies in the United States. He released the Icon compilation album that same year, though it failed to chart on any chart worldwide. Zombie released his fifth studio album, Venomous Rat Regeneration Vendor in 2013. The album became his fifth top ten on the Billboard 200, though went on to become his lowest selling album to date. His latest album The Lunar Injection Kool Aid Eclipse Conspiracy reached the No.1 on the Billboard's Top Album Sales chart, his only album to do so.

Albums

Studio albums

Live albums

Remix albums

Compilation albums

Video albums

Singles

Music videos

Soundtracks contributions

Other album appearances

Notes

References

Discography
Heavy metal discographies
Discographies of American artists